Green Ideas is a series of books published by Penguin Books in the UK, on environmental subjects. The series began in 2021, and contains twenty short books.

Books

See also 

 Penguin Essentials

References

External links 

 Official website

Lists of books
Penguin Books book series
Environmental books